Paradise Postponed (1986) is a British 11-episode TV serial based on the 1985  novel by writer John Mortimer. The series covered a span of 30 years of postwar British history, set in a small village.

Plot
The series explores the mystery of why Reverend Simeon Simcox, a "wealthy Socialist rector", bequeathed the millions of the Simcox brewery estate to Leslie Titmuss, the son of Simcox's accountant George Titmus, who has risen from doing odd jobs for the rector to be a city developer and Conservative cabinet minister. Simeon's sons Fred, a jazz-drumming country doctor, and Henry, once Britain's brightest and angriest writer who now works for Hollywood, conduct inquiries into their father's life as they try to understand the will. The setting of the work in an English village shows it absorbing and reflecting the upheavals of British society from the 1940s to the 1970s, and the many changes of the post-World War II society.

Cast

 Michael Hordern - Rev. Simeon Simcox
 Annette Crosbie - Dorothy Simcox
 Peter Egan -  Henry Simcox
 Paul Shelley - Fred Simcox
 Colin Blakely - Dr. Salter
 Eleanor David - Agnes Simcox, née Salter
 Jill Bennett - Lady Grace Fanner
 Richard Vernon - Sir Nicholas Fanner
 Zoë Wanamaker - Charlotte 'Charlie' Titmuss, née Fanner
 David Threlfall - Leslie Titmuss
 Colin Jeavons - George Titmuss
 Albert Welling - Rev. Kevin Bulstrode
 Harold Innocent - Jackson Catelow
 Thomas Heathcote - Tom Nowt
 Claire Oberman - Lonnie Simcox, née Hope

Production
The TV series was directed by Alvin Rakoff and was mainly shot in Henley-on-Thames and Marlow, Buckinghamshire in the second half of 1985. A three-part sequel, entitled Titmuss Regained, aired in 1991.

Reception
The New York Times described the series as a "decided disappointment," with Mortimer having perhaps taken on too much. The technique of time shifts from the present to near past is said to be confusing more than illuminating of its characters. While containing a "distinct whiff of snobbery", the character of the lower-class Leslie Titmuss who rises on his wiles is developed as the most fascinating figure in the cast. In a 2014 retrospective review, Toby Manning of The Guardian described the series as "beautifully acted", which "simply oozes nostalgia for a bygone Britain", and called the character Titmuss "quite simply one of the most compelling characters in TV history."

References

External links
 
 
 Review of Mortimer's novel, Time magazine (1986)
 Review of the TV series, The New York Times (1986)

1986 British television series debuts
1986 British television series endings
1980s British drama television series
1980s British television miniseries
ITV television dramas
Television shows based on British novels
Period television series
Works by John Mortimer
Television shows produced by Thames Television
Television series by Euston Films
English-language television shows
Television series about Christian religious leaders
Films directed by Alvin Rakoff